Al Hazm Castle, also known as Al Hazm fort, is a castle in Rustaq, Oman.

History 
It was built by Imam Sultan bin Saif II in 1708. It was built as a residence for the imam. The castle also had a prison, mosque, and religious classrooms.

After Sultan bin Saif II died in 1718, he was buried within the castle.

In 1988, it was submitted to the tentative list of the UNESCO World Heritage sites. It was undergoing restoration work as of 2020.

Architecture 

It is a large rectangular construction flanked by two round fortified towers. The towers are on the Southern and Eastern corners. The castle features a large intricately carved wooden door.

References 

Forts in Oman